Ron Carey is an American politician advisor who worked as chairman of the Republican Party of Minnesota from June 11, 2005, until July 1, 2009.

Early life and education 
Carey is a native of Iowa. He earned a Bachelor of Science degree in business administration from the University of Northwestern – St. Paul.

Career 
Carey served as chief of staff for Congresswoman Michele Bachmann. He was first elected chair of the Minnesota Republican Party by the party's central committee on June 11, 2005, succeeding Ron Eibensteiner. He was re-elected on the first ballot in June 2007. Prior to serving as chair, he was the state party's treasurer. During the 2008 Republican Party presidential primaries, Carey endorsed Arkansas Governor Mike Huckabee. He supported Donald Trump in the 2016 United States presidential election.

References

External links 
 Republican Party of Minnesota

Living people
Minnesota Republicans
State political party chairs of Minnesota
University of Northwestern – St. Paul alumni
Year of birth missing (living people)